Suszyna  is a village in the administrative district of Gmina Radków, within Kłodzko County, Lower Silesian Voivodeship, in southwest Poland.

Geography
It is a small chain village in the south-eastern part of the Ścinawskie Hills . It lies at an altitude of about 380–415 m above sea level, in a fairly deep valley, through which flows down a small stream. These ridges are built of red-spotted sludge with melafir clusters. Value are found in the specimens of minerals and precious stones (decorative) particularly found here brush amethyst and agate. In the hamlet Suszyny - Mrówieńcu (Ger. Finkenhübel b. SeifersdorfIn the years 1830-1840, high quality graphite was extracted.

History
Dürrkunzendorf was mentioned for the first time in 1353 as "czu dorryn Cunczendorf" and in 1384 as "Dorrenkunzendorf". It belonged to the District Wünschelburg in the Glatzerland, which was a sub-country of the Crown Bohemia . With this he shared the history of his political and ecclesiastical affiliation since his existence. It consisted of two parts:
The Freirichtergut owned Peter Trautmann in 1408. The following owners included the families of Alt, Sauern and Ullersdorf . Johann Georg von Ullersdorf sold it to Franz Anton von Haugwitz in 1738 on Pischkowitz . From this time it was called the Haugwitz part. 
The Dominial portion belonged to the Titzko of Pannwitz in 1348, which was among other things also in the possession of the neighboring rule Hummel . From 1454 to 1625 it belonged to the nobility of the nobility Doing . In 1628, this share was converted from a fief to an inheritance belonging to the owners of the castle court in Niedersteine, most recently the Earl of Magnis .

After the Silesian wars, Dürrkunzendorf came together with the County of Glatz in 1763 with the Hubertusburger Frieden to Prussia . After the reorganization of Prussia, it had belonged to the province of Silesia since 1815, which was divided into counties. 1816-1853 was the district of Glatz, 1854-1932 the county of Neurode responsible. After its dissolution in 1933 Dürrkunzendorf belonged again to the district of Glatz. Since 1874 it formed together with the rural community Seifersdorf and agricultural estates same the District Seifersdorf [2] .

As a consequence of the Second World War Dürrkunzendorf fell to Poland in 1945 and was renamed Suszyna . The German population was expelled in 1946. The newly settled inhabitants were partly home-displaced from Eastern Poland . 1975-1998, Suszyna belonged to the Wałbrzych voivodship (German Waldenburg )

Demography
After 1945 the Poles settled here, according to data from 1947, the highest number of them came from the Cracow province - 203, and from Kresów : from Lwow - 83 and Tarnopol - 66. The village lost its function as a resort. The airport and glider school were devastated (the school was run by a rural school ). The village, however, is partially depopulated and is now exclusively agricultural. According to the National Census (III 2011) it had 233 inhabitants.

Observation Tower

The 27-meter Susilo tower stands on an elevation of 469.2 m asl, belonging to the south-eastern part of the Ścinawskie Hills . On the 22nd floor there is a viewing platform with 140 stairs. The inner cross-section of the tower is six meters. The tower is reinforced, externally and internally lined with stone sandstone.

The tower was co-financed by the Czech Republic - Republic of Poland 2007-2013 Cross-border Cooperation Operational Program under the project "Glacensis Euroregion". Construction cost about one million zlotys.

The object is one of several lookout towers in the Middle Sudetes. Others are on: Mount St. Anne, Mount All Saints, Grodziszcz, Kalenica, Wielka Sowie and Włodzicka Góra . From the tower you can watch: Broumov Walls, Mount St. Anne, Mount of All Saints, Bardo Mountains, Eagle Mountains, Owl Mountains, Mountain Gold and Śnieżnik.

References

Suszyna